Mordellistena diversa is a beetle in the genus Mordellistena of the family Mordellidae. It was described in 1968 by Ermisch.

References

diversa
Beetles described in 1968